is a species of flowering plant in the family Asteraceae that is endemic to Honshū, Japan.

Taxonomy
First described in 1910 by Japanese botanists Jinzō Matsumura and Gen-ichi Koidzumi, as Chrysanthemum rupestre, in 1978  transferred the taxon from Chrysanthemum to Dendranthema, as Dendranthema rupestre, then in 1983 Albert Akramovich Muldashev transferred it to the genus Ajania, the new combination being Ajania rupestris.

Distribution
Ajania rupestris occurs from southern Tōhoku to the Chūbu region.

References

Anthemideae
Endemic flora of Japan
Plants described in 1910
Taxa named by Gen-ichi Koidzumi
Taxa named by Jinzō Matsumura